Xuanhe Township is a township in Liancheng County, Heihe, Fujian, China. , it has thirteen villages under its administration:
Xincao Village
Zhongcao Village
Shangcao Village
Xiacao Village
Chengxi Village
Kenan Village
Yangbei Village
Huangsha Village
Zhongtian Village
Shengxing Village
Peitian Village
Zilin Village
Qianjin Village

References 

Township-level divisions of Fujian
Liancheng County